Dunkerque Handball Grand Littoral is a handball club from Dunkerque, France. Currently, US Dunkerque HB competes in the French First League of Handball since 1991.

Crest, colours, supporters

Naming history

Kits

Sports Hall information

Name: – Stade des Flandres
City: – Dunkerque
Capacity: – 2400
Address: – Av. de Rosendaël Jacques Collache, 59240 Dunkerque, France

Honors

EHF Cup:
Runner Up : 2012

EHF Challenge Cup:
Runner Up : 2004

France Handball League: 1
Champion :  2014.

Coupe de France: 1
Winner : 2011
Runner Up : 1991, 2000

Coupe de la Ligue: 1
Winner : 2013
Runner Up : 2002

Team

Current squad
Squad for the 2021–22 season.

Goalkeepers
 34  Samir Bellahcene
 77  Valentin Kieffer
Wingers
LW
 10  Dylan Tossin
 55  Steve-Marie Joseph
RW
 5  Florian Billant
 9  Théo Avelange Demouge
Line players
 3  Benjamin Afgour
 18  Baptiste Capelle
 69  Jihed Jaballah
 70  Gabriel Nyembo 

Back players
LB
 22  Dylan Garain
 30  Gautier Crepel
 99  Edson Imare
CB
 6  Kornél Nagy
 20  Josef Pujol 
 36  Abdelkader Rahim
 44  Kamel Alouini
RB
 17  Gabin Martinez
 59  Tom Pelayo

Transfers
Transfers for the 2021–22 season  

 Joining
  Valentin Kieffer (GK) (from  Saran Loiret Handball)
  Théo Avelange Demouge (RW) (from  Saran Loiret Handball)
  Gautier Crepel (LB) (from own row)
  Josef Pujol (CB) (from  Elverum Håndball)
  Edson Imare (LB) (from  Massy Essonne Handball)

 Leaving
  Oleg Grams (GK) (to ?)
  Reinier Taboada (LB) (to  RK Eurofarm Pelister)
  Yoel Cuni Morales (RB) (to  RK Vardar)
  Jan Jurečič (RW) (to  Orlen Wisła Płock)

Former club members

Notable former players

  Benjamin Afgour (2008–2017, 2020–)
  William Annotel (2011–2018)
  Florian Billant (2014–)
  Sébastien Bosquet (1999–2003, 2005–2013)
  Baptiste Butto (2009–2021)
  Philippe Debureau (1981–1984, 1986–1993)
  Frédéric Dole (1998–1999)
  Dylan Garain (2017–2018, 2019–)
  Vincent Gérard (2010–2015)
  Mickaël Grocaut (2002–2018)
  Guillaume Joli (2012–2014, 2016–2019)
  Bastien Lamon (2001–2017)
  Erwan Siakam-Kadji (2007–2014)
  Pierre Soudry (2006–2019)
  Arnaud Siffert (2006–2011)
  Yérime Sylla (1994–2001)
  Mohamed Mokrani (2008–2015)
  Abdelkader Rahim (2017–2022)
  Haniel Langaro (2017–2020)
  Alexandro Pozzer (2017–2018)
  Marko Mamić (2015–2017)
  Kornél Nagy (2011–)
  Péter Tatai (2008–2010)
  Ragnar Þór Óskarsson (2000–2004, 2008–2011)
  Žarko Pejović (2014–2017)
  Espen Lie Hansen (2012–2014)
  Dawid Nilsson (2010–2012)
  Wilson Davyes (2017–2019)
  Sorin Toacsen (2004–2006)
  Oleg Grams (2017–2021)
  Jan Jurečič (2019–2021)
  Diego Piñeiro (2018–2021)
  Dragan Mladenović (1992–2004)
  Predrag Vejin (2015–2016)
  Jihed Jaballah (2022–)
  Jaleleddine Touati (2006–2015)

Former coaches

External links

French handball clubs
Sport in Dunkirk